Corn Exchange, Manchester is a grade II listed building in Manchester, England. The building was originally used as a corn exchange and was previously named the Corn & Produce Exchange, and subsequently The Triangle. Following the IRA bomb in 1996 it was renovated and was a modern shopping centre until 2014. The building was sold to investors and has been re-developed into a number of food outlets.

History

The first Corn Exchange built on this site in 1837 was designed by Richard Lane. This was demolished in 1896 and replaced in two sections between 1896 and 1903. Each section was designed by a different architect, the first from 1896–99 by Ball & Elce and the second, from 1899–1903, by Potts, Son, & Hennings. Before 1837 it traded from Hanging Ditch.
The Corn & Produce Exchange was the gathering spot for thousands of traders from all over the region. This continued until the economic depression of the 1920s and 1930s. Following the Second World War, trade gradually declined and the trading floor fell into disuse.

The building was used briefly by the Royal Exchange Theatre Company from 1976. It also served as a filming location for Granada Television's Brideshead Revisited.

Until 1996 it was a gathering place for alternative communities and contained a large market with small stallholders selling clothes, jewellery and piercing paraphernalia, and second hand record shops. Many of the shops were temporary structures on the trading floor of the exchange, with other shops operated from permanent units and offices around the perimeter. There was also a small café in a basement area to the northeast of the ground floor. The exterior of the building also housed many shops in a basement area.

After being heavily damaged by the 1996 bomb many of these businesses were forced to move to new premises, mostly in the north of the city, where many foundered. The Corn Exchange was renovated and reopened as the Triangle Shopping Centre (because of its shape). Most of the Edwardian interior was replaced by high-class retail outlets including MUJI, a flagship Adidas store, O'Neill and Jigsaw, all of which have now closed.

In 2005, The Norwich Property Trust, the largest authorised commercial property unit trust in the UK, acquired the Triangle for £67 million from American property company the Blackstone Group and its UK-based partners Milligan Retail Resorts International.

In 2012, The Triangle was relaunched as Corn Exchange, Manchester. Plans were revealed to convert the building into a food outlet and hotel. In 2014 work commenced by a demolition company to strip out modern interior materials and fixtures, some of which were being offered for reuse as salvage and reclamation, prior to recycling or landfill. The food outlet opened in 2015. In 2018, Roomzzz Aparthotels opened with a 114 rooms on the upper floors of the Corn Exchange with a ground floor reception at the main entrance.

See also

Listed buildings in Manchester-M4

References

External links

Corn Exchange, Manchester
Manchester Corn Exchange reclamation

Commercial buildings in Manchester
Grade II listed buildings in Manchester
Grade II listed commercial buildings
Tourist attractions in Manchester